Geoffrey Moore (born 1946) is an American consultant and author.

Geoffrey or Geoff Moore  may also refer to:
Geoffrey Moore, son of actor Roger Moore
Geoffrey H. Moore, American researcher
Geoff Moore (born 1961), musician
Geoff Moore (photographer)

See also
 Jeff Moores, rugby league footballer of the 1920s and 1930s for Western Suburbs Magpies, Leeds, and York
Jeff Moore (disambiguation)